Before the TOPS Class 97 was issued to self-propelled locomotives in departmental (non-revenue earning) use, British Rail had such locomotives numbered in a variety of series, together with locomotives that were no longer self-propelled. See Also:
 Southern Region 'DS'-prefix series
 Eastern Region 1-100 series

Western Region series
The Great Western Railway purchased two diesel shunters during its existence, which were numbered 1 and 2. Number 1 was effectively a departmental locomotive, while 2 was in capital stock. Details of both locomotives may be found here.

The GWR also owned a number of small petrol shunters built by Motor Rail, which carried numbers 15 and 22-27 in their departmental number series. These survived to be taken over by British Rail, which did not renumber them. These shunters are listed below.

The Western Region of British Rail used a PWM (Permanent Way Machinery) series which incorporated some locomotives. The two narrow gauge GWR petrol shunters were allocated numbers in this series, as were the five shunters PWM650-PWM654, which were later renumbered as 97650-97654.

Engineering Department series
The London Midland Region Engineering Department numbered its diesel locomotives in a series running from ED1 upwards (though ED8 and ED9 were never allocated).

966xxx and 968xxx series
The 968xxx series (in the carriage and wagon number series) was used for departmental locomotives from 1968 onwards. Previously, some former Class 08 shunters that were converted to snowploughs had been numbered in the 966xxx series, but this was discontinued and some of these locomotives were renumbered into the 968xxx series.

When the Class 97 series for self-propelled locomotives was introduced, some locomotives in this series were renumbered to Class 97, leaving the 968xxx numbers just for locomotives that were no longer self-propelled. Since privatisation, other numbering schemes have been used for locomotives used for a similar-purpose as those in the 968xxx series. For completion these locomotives are also included. Details of all locomotives are shown below:

Internal User series
Internal User vehicles are those that are not allowed to run on the mainline, but are only for use within depot complexes. They are often stationary, though not always. Two former locomotives that were heavily stripped, leaving just the frames, to carry power units within Toton depot were allocated IU numbers.

Miscellaneous locomotives
Brush Traction, Loughborough were using a British Rail Class 56 locomotive, 56009 in their works as a power unit transporter and test bed for a Class 56 overhaul programme. It was not registered on the TOPS system, but Brush had given it the painted TOPS-like number 56201. This programme was abandoned, leaving the loco in extended storage for over 16 years. It since been sold to UKRL leasing and remains stored at Shackerstone with plans to overhaul it as part of their re-engineering programme.

A heavily stripped Class 73 locomotive, 73126 was used as a static training locomotive at the Fire Service College in Moreton-in-Marsh, replacing the previously used locomotives TDB 968030 (33018, preserved and now under restoration at a private site near Mangapps Farm in Essex) and ADB 968034 (08769, preserved at Severn Valley Railway). Since this locomotive was converted after privatisation it was not renumbered into the 968xxx series. Bought by Cotswold Rail's Adrian Parcell and later sold to the college, the locomotive was little more than a shell after 4 years as a spares donor at Stewart's Lane and Old Oak Common, and after 9 years was sold for scrap at Booth Roe Metals, Rotherham in August 2009.

References

 
British Rail locomotives